Mansoor Ahmed (born 10 September 1981) is a Pakistani cricketer. He played in 44 first-class and 13 List A matches between 1999 and 2015.

References

External links
 

1981 births
Living people
Pakistani cricketers
Karachi cricketers
Pakistan Customs cricketers
Public Works Department cricketers
Quetta cricketers
Sui Southern Gas Company cricketers
Cricketers from Karachi